Poster is a surname. Notable people with the surname include:

Jem Poster, British poet and novelist
Kim Poster, American and British theatre producer
Mark Poster, American Professor Emeritus of History and Film and Media Studies 
Meryl Poster, American film producer and businessperson
Randall Poster, American music supervisor 
Ron Poster, Boston Bruins stadium organist
Steven Poster,  American cinematographer and photographer